Allan Bak Jensen (born 21 March 1978 in Denmark) is a Danish retired footballer.

Career

In 2000/01, Bak Jensen scored 16 goals in the Danish Superliga, and was the second top scorer that season.

At the age of 25, he retired from football due to a long-term back injury.

After retirement, he became an agent and founded Elite Consulting, which is considered to be Denmark's most successful agent group.

References

External links
 

Danish men's footballers
Living people
Association football wingers
Association football forwards
Association football midfielders
1978 births
People from Herning Municipality
Ikast FS players
FC Midtjylland players
SC Heerenveen players
Sportspeople from the Central Denmark Region